Stojan "Stojančo" Zlatanovski (born 29 November 1960) is a Macedonian former footballer.

Club career
Born in Skopje, he played with FK Vardar in the Yugoslav First and Second Leagues between 1978 and the winter break of the 1982–83 season. Then he joined Second-level FK Timok and played there till the end of the season. He play in the Second League the following three seasons, first with FK Bregalnica in the following two seasons and then with Serbian side FK Radnički Niš in the 1985–86 season.

In summer 1986, he left Radnički Niš and moved to Spain where he played with Castellón in the 1986–87 Segunda División and was nicknamed Zlatan.

He later played in Belgium with K.F.C. Lommel S.K. in 1988–89, and in Greece with PAS Giannina in 1990–91.

International career
He played for Yugoslavia U-18 in 1979 making 5 appearances and scoring one goal.

References

1960 births
Living people
Footballers from Skopje
Association football forwards
Macedonian footballers
Yugoslav footballers
FK Vardar players
FK Timok players
FK Bregalnica Štip players
FK Radnički Niš players
CD Castellón footballers
K.F.C. Lommel S.K. players
PAS Giannina F.C. players
Yugoslav First League players
Segunda División players
Challenger Pro League players
Super League Greece players
Yugoslav expatriate footballers
Expatriate footballers in Spain
Yugoslav expatriate sportspeople in Spain
Expatriate footballers in Belgium
Yugoslav expatriate sportspeople in Belgium
Expatriate footballers in Greece
Yugoslav expatriate sportspeople in Greece